Acleris senescens is a species of moth of the family Tortricidae. It is found in North America, where it is found along the Pacific Coast from British Columbia to California.

The length of the forewings is 10.2–12.2 mm. The forewings range from uniform grey with a dark longitudinal line, to specimens with forewings which are mottled with black spots and lines. Adults have been recorded on wing in early spring and late fall in the south, probably in two generations per year.

The larvae possibly feed on Alnus, Ceanothus and Salix species.

References

Moths described in 1874
senescens
Moths of North America